Korona Kielce II is a Polish football team, which serves as the reserve side of Korona Kielce. They compete in III liga, group IV. the forth division of Polish football. They participated in the 2009–10 Polish Cup.

Biggest achievements
 II liga (3rd tier): 
 6th place: 2006–07
 III liga (4th tier): 
 Winner: 2005–06, 2008–091
1Due to the fact that Korona Kielce II could not be promoted to the central level, the promotion was won by the vice-champion – LKS Nieciecza.

Polish Cup records

References

External links
 Korona Kielce II at 90minut.pl 
 Korona Kielce II home stadium at mosir.kielce.pl 

 
Football clubs in Świętokrzyskie Voivodeship
Sport in Kielce
Reserve team football in Poland